Love What Happened Here is the fifth solo EP by English musician and producer James Blake. It was first released on 12 December 2011 as digital download and then on 2 March 2012 on 12" vinyl record. It was produced by James Blake and mastered by Matt Colton.

Track listing

Personnel
James Blake – writing, production
Matt Colton – mastering

Chart performance

References

Albums produced by James Blake (musician)
James Blake (musician) albums
2011 EPs